Anjoor  is a village in Thrissur district in the state of Kerala, India.

Summary
 India census, Anjoor had a population of 9152 with 4462 males and 4690 females.
Its on the way to Althara from Kunnamkulam. Anjoor has the majority Christian community settlement rest covers Hindus and Muslims. The best landmark is Xavier's church and it is one of the historical symbol. Anjoor had an old age tree which was located in the centre and it was fallen off recently during rainy season. People are co-operative and friendly. This place connects almost all the other major towns.

References

Villages in Thrissur district